Calgary/Okotoks (Rowland Field) Aerodrome  is located  south of Calgary and about  north of Okotoks, Alberta, Canada.

See also
 List of airports in the Calgary area

References

Registered aerodromes in Alberta
Foothills County
Okotoks